Kingstown is a census-designated place (CDP) in Queen Anne's County, Maryland, United States. The population was 1,644 at the 2000 census.

History
The log canoe Mystery was listed on the National Register of Historic Places in 1985.

Geography
Kingstown is located at  (39.208840, −76.043034).

Demographics

As of the census of 2000, there were 1,644 people, 668 households, and 486 families residing in the CDP. The racial makeup of the CDP was 92.82% White, 6.14% African American, 0.18% Native American, 0.49% Asian, 0.06% from other races, and 0.30% from two or more races. Hispanic or Latino of any race were 0.55% of the population.

There were 668 households, out of which 31.1% had children under the age of 18 living with them, 60.6% were married couples living together, 10.2% had a female householder with no husband present, and 27.2% were non-families. 22.9% of all households were made up of individuals, and 10.9% had someone living alone who was 65 years of age or older. The average household size was 2.46 and the average family size was 2.88.

In the CDP, the population was spread out, with 24.5% under the age of 18, 5.1% from 18 to 24, 24.9% from 25 to 44, 27.1% from 45 to 64, and 18.4% who were 65 years of age or older. The median age was 42 years. For every 100 females, there were 93.2 males. For every 100 females age 18 and over, there were 88.6 males.

The median income for a household in the CDP was $49,539, and the median income for a family was $59,063. Males had a median income of $40,820 versus $26,167 for females. The per capita income for the CDP was $26,616. About 1.3% of families and 4.2% of the population were below the poverty line, including 3.9% of those under age 18 and none of those age 65 or over.

References

Census-designated places in Queen Anne's County, Maryland
Census-designated places in Maryland